MORE is the third full-length album by Baltimore punk rock band Double Dagger.

Track listing
 "No Allies" – 2:45 
 "Vivre Sans Temps Mort" – 5:25 
 "We Are The Ones" – 3:41
 "Camouflage" – 3:34
 "The Lie/The Truth" – 2:56
 "Surrealist Composition With Your Face" – 3:33
 "Helicopter Lullaby" – 4:18
 "Neon Gray" – 3:24
 "Half-Life" – 5:53
 "Two-Way Mirror" – 4:21
 "Stagger Lee (Bonus Digital Only Track)" –  3:06

Personnel 

 Denny Bowen – drums
 Nolen Strals – vocals
 Bruce Willen – bass

References

Double Dagger (band) albums
2009 albums